The Minab River is a river in Hormozgan province, and Sistan and Baluchestan, Iran, near Harmosia.

This river is formed by adjoining of two smaller rivers, the Roudan and Joqeen. These two 
rivers meet near the village of Borjegan, 25 km south east of Minab city and  the river empties into the Strait of Hormuz at Sirik, Iran. Here there is a flourishing Mangrove ecosystem.

Minab River The river has a dam 2km from Minab and the valley is known for rich agricultureal produce and shrimp from the strait of Hormuz.

In ancient times, the Minab was the site of Alexandria Carmania, a Greek Colony founded by Alexander the Great in January 324B.C. after his army had reunited with Nearchus and his men who had beached their boats near the mouth of the Minab River, which was then called Anamis or Saganos.

References 

Minab County
Rivers of Hormozgan Province
Populated places along the Silk Road
Asian archaeology
History of the Middle East
Landforms of Hormozgan Province